King of Kings (also referred to as Touchdown Jesus) was a  tall statue of Jesus on the east side of Interstate 75 at the Solid Rock Church, a 4000+ member Christian megachurch near Monroe, Ohio, in the United States. It was destroyed by a lightning strike and subsequent fire on June 14, 2010.

Located on the interstate-facing side of the church's outdoor amphitheater, the statue was set on an island at the head of the church's baptismal pool, flanked by fountains and lit by colored spotlights. It depicted Jesus from the chest up, with his arms and head raised to the sky. The statue had a  span between its upraised hands and a  Christian cross at its base.
A replacement statue, called Lux Mundi, was assembled and dedicated on the site in September 2012.

Construction
It was designed by Brad Coriell, sculpted by James Lynch, and assembled by Mark Mitten.

Constructed on a metal frame or armature manufactured in nearby Lebanon, the sculpted figure itself was created in Jacksonville, Florida, then trucked north. The main body of the statue was made from a core of Styrofoam covered by a thin skin of fiberglass.

The sculpted statue was completed in September 2004 at a cost of approximately $250,000. Coriell donated some of his time to the project.

Popularity and nicknames
The statue was given many nicknames, both affectionate and derisive, by local residents and I-75 travelers. Among them were:
Big J
Big Butter Jesus
Touchdown Jesus (based on a similarity to the mural on the Hesburgh Library overlooking Notre Dame Stadium; American football referees signal a touchdown with a similar gesture)
Super Jesus
MC 62-Foot Jesus (like musician MC 900 Ft. Jesus)

The statue was also credited with inspiring two musical works:
Comedian Heywood Banks wrote and performed his novelty song "Big Butter Jesus" about the statue.
Singer-songwriter Robbie Schaefer of the band Eddie from Ohio wrote the song "Monroe, OH" after driving past the statue.

The statue was also a popular photographic subject for fans of The Ohio State University, who would align Jesus' upraised arms as the "H" when spelling out "O-H-I-O".

Destruction
On June 14, 2010, the statue was struck by lightning and consumed in the resulting blaze. The fire consumed all but the internal metal structure. Following the fire, the pastor of the church stated that the church planned to rebuild the statue with fireproof material. In the days after the destruction, the church's digital sign displayed the message "He'll be back".

Although the statue cost about $250,000 to construct, it was insured for $500,000 because Coriell had donated his time to the creation. It was estimated that the statue and amphitheater sustained an estimated $700,000 in damages – $300,000 for the statue and $400,000 for the amphitheater. PETA offered funding through an "anonymous Christian donor" to help rebuild the statue if allowed to promote veganism at the church.

Replacement statue

Construction of a  replacement statue with a substantially different design began in June 2012. The new statue, called Lux Mundi, was assembled on the site on September 19, 2012, and dedicated on September 30, 2012.

See also
List of statues of Jesus
List of tallest statues
List of the tallest statues in the United States

References

External links
Solid Rock Church website
Pictures of the statue
From the Vault: Remember 'Touchdown Jesus?'

Colossal statues of Jesus
Fires in Ohio
Monuments and memorials in Ohio
Outdoor sculptures in Ohio
Roadside attractions in the United States
2004 sculptures
Buildings and structures in Warren County, Ohio
Burned buildings and structures in the United States
Fiberglass sculptures in Ohio
Destroyed sculptures
Christianity in Ohio
2004 establishments in Ohio
2010 disestablishments in Ohio